1-1 may refer to:
 New Year's Day, a public holiday in many countries, held annually on the first of January
 Schweizer SGP 1-1, an American glider design
 World 1-1, the first level of Nintendo's Super Mario Bros

See also
 One-to-one (disambiguation)